Újbuda-központ (lit. "Újbuda-Centrum") is a station on Line 4 of the Budapest Metro. The station is an important traffic junction. Tramways leading to southern Buda cross road traffic from Petőfi Bridge here. It is also the southern terminus of Tramline 4. The station was opened on 28 March 2014 as part of the inaugural section of the line, from Keleti pályaudvar to Kelenföld vasútállomás.

Connections
Bus: 33, 53, 58, 150, 153, 154, 212, 212A, 212B
Tram: 4, 17, 41, 47, 48, 56

References

Official web page of the construction

M4 (Budapest Metro) stations
Railway stations opened in 2014
2014 establishments in Hungary